Theodore George Karras Jr. (born December 10, 1964) is an American football coach and former player. He is the head football coach at Marian University in Indianapolis, a position he first held from the program's inception in 2007 through the 2012 season and resumed in December 2022. Karras was the head football coach at Rose–Hulman Institute of Technology in Terre Haute, Indiana from 2003 to 2005 and Walsh University in North Canton, Ohio from 2013 to 2016. He led the 2012 Marian Knights football team to the NAIA Football National Championship title.

Karras played college football as a defensive tackle at Northwestern University from 1983 to 1986 and played one game as a replacement player with the Washington Redskins of the National Football League (NFL) during the players' strike in 1987. His father, Ted Karras Sr., played for the Chicago Bears in the 1960s. His uncles also played in the NFL: Alex Karras for the Detroit Lions and Lou Karras for the Washington Redskins. His son, Ted Karras III, is currently in the NFL as the starting center for the Cincinnati Bengals.

Coaching career
Karras was a graduate assistant at the University of Minnesota in 1991 and at Northern Illinois University in 1992. He then worked as a defensive assistant at Lake Forest College from 1993 to 1994 and as a defensive line coach at the University of St. Francis in 1995. In 1996, Karras became the head football coach for Andrean High School in Merrillville, Indiana, and took his team to the state championship, where they lost to Bishop Chatard High School of Indianapolis. In 1999, Karras moved on to Saint Xavier University in Chicago as offensive coordinator. After four years at Saint Xavier, Karras moved to Terre Haute, Indiana to become head football coach at Rose-Hulman Institute of Technology. In 2006, Karras took the job of coaching the inaugural football team at Marian University.

In the football program's sixth year of play in 2012, Karras led the Knights to the 2012 NAIA Football National Championship, where they won 30–27 in overtime. After the 2012 football season, Karras left Marian to become the second head football coach in Walsh University's school history, replacing Jim Dennison. Walsh, located in North Canton, Ohio, formally introduced Karras as the Cavaliers' new head coach on December 21, 2012. At the end of the 2016 season, in which the Cavaliers compiled a 1–10 record, the worst in program history, Walsh University announced that Karras would no longer be coaching the team.

On December 22, 2022, Karras returned to Marian as head football coach for the 2023 season.

Head coaching record

College

References

External links
 Saint Francis profile
 

1964 births
Living people
American football defensive tackles
Lake Forest Foresters football coaches
Marian Knights football coaches
Minnesota Golden Gophers football coaches
Northern Illinois Huskies football coaches
Northwestern Wildcats football players
Rose–Hulman Fightin' Engineers football coaches
Saint Francis Cougars football coaches
Saint Xavier Cougars football coaches
St. Francis Fighting Saints football coaches
Walsh Cavaliers football coaches
Washington Redskins players
High school football coaches in Indiana
People from Merrillville, Indiana
Sportspeople from Terre Haute, Indiana
Coaches of American football from Indiana
Players of American football from Gary, Indiana
Karras football family